Amatusuk Hills is a mountain range in North Slope Borough, Alaska, in the United States.

Amatusuk is likely a name of Eskimo origin of unknown meaning.

References

Hills of Alaska
Mountains of North Slope Borough, Alaska
Mountain ranges of Alaska